The National Women's Soccer League (NWSL) is the top-tier professional women's soccer league in the United States and Canada. Founded in 2013, the 2019 season, the last before COVID-19, saw an average 7,337 spectators among the 9 teams, the highest average attendance in league history. Its overall attendance in 2019 was also its highest ever, with 792,409 total. The overall attendance record was broken in the 2022 season, the first since 2019 to be relatively unaffected by COVID-19, with a total of 1,042,063. However, the per-game record from 2019 remains intact; the league had 10 teams in 2019 but expanded to 12 for 2022. The NWSL has the highest average attendance per game among all women's professional sports leagues in the United States.

NWSL attendance has grown since the league's inaugural season in 2013. The per-game average attendance of 7,337 in 2019 was a 21.8% increase over the previous record of 6,024 set in 2018. The 2019 average was a 71.8% increase over the 4,270 average in the league's inaugural 2013 season, a growth rate of 9.4% per year. The total attendance in 2019 was a 111% increase over the 375,763 total in 2013, a growth rate of 13.2% per year.

Season averages

By team

NWSL attendance vs. other leagues

vs. other North American women's professional leagues
The following table compares the NWSL regular season average attendance against the regular season average attendance for other professional women's sports leagues in North America.

Notes: Italics indicate statistics for the previous season; NPF had 6 teams for its 2016 & 2017 seasons, though attendance numbers for those are not available.

vs. other North American professional soccer leagues
The following table compares the NWSL regular season average attendance against the regular season average attendance for other professional soccer leagues in North America. All attendance figures are from seasons in 2019 or earlier, the last completed seasons unaffected by COVID-19.

Today, two other professional man's leagues operate in northern North America, but neither has played a complete season unaffected by COVID-19. The National Independent Soccer Association started play in 2019, but initially played a fall-to-spring season, meaning that its first season was affected by the pandemic. It now uses the same spring-to-fall season used by most other U.S. soccer leagues. MLS Next Pro began play in 2022.

vs. other worldwide women's top-division soccer leagues
The following table compares the NWSL regular season average attendance against the regular season average attendance for a selection other top-flight soccer leagues from around the world; this list is not exhaustive.

Individual game highest attendance

Regular season

* indicates part of a doubleheader with other teams Sellout

Playoffs

* indicates "home" team in predetermined venue for championship final Sellout

See also 
 List of National Women's Soccer League stadiums
 NWSL records and statistics

References

External links
 

Attendance
National Women's Soccer League
Women's association football records and statistics